Aspergillus crustosus is a species of fungus in the genus Aspergillus. It is from the Aenei section. The species was first described in 1965. It has been reported to produce PR-toxin.

Growth and morphology

A. crustosus has been cultivated on both Czapek yeast extract agar (CYA) plates and Malt Extract Agar Oxoid® (MEAOX) plates. The growth morphology of the colonies can be seen in the pictures below.

References 

crustosus
Fungi described in 1965